STDM may refer to:
 Statistical time-division multiplexing 
 Sociedade de Turismo e Diversões de Macau
 Spread-Transform Dither Modulation
 Spatio-temporal Data Mining
 Société de Transports Départementaux de la Marne
 STEINMETZDEMEYER architectes urbanistes